Thomas Bruce Rowe (born November 8, 1942) is a Canadian politician who was an elected member to the Legislative Assembly of Alberta representing the electoral district of Olds-Didsbury-Three Hills from 2012 until 2015. Prior to the 2012 provincial election Rowe served as mayor of the village of Beiseker, Alberta.

He was elected to the Legislature in 2012 as a member of the Wildrose Party caucus.

Rowe is an electrical contractor by trade, and operated his own small business for 35 years. He was elected to Beiseker village council in 2001, as well as the Alberta Urban Municipalities Association board of directors. He retired from the private sector in 2005 to focus on his political career.

After a shorter than expected spring session sitting of the Legislative Assembly in 2013, Rowe expressed frustration to local media.

On December 17, 2014, he was one of nine Wildrose MLAs who crossed the floor to join the Progressive Conservative caucus.  Rowe subsequently announced his retirement from politics and did not seek re-election in the 2015 Alberta general election.

Electoral history

References

Wildrose Party MLAs
Living people
Mayors of places in Alberta
Year of birth uncertain
1942 births
Progressive Conservative Association of Alberta MLAs
People from Medicine Hat
People from Rocky View County
21st-century Canadian politicians